Brian D. Miller may refer to:
 Brian Miller (New York politician), American politician 
 Brian D. Miller (attorney), American attorney